A Murder on the Appian Way is a historical novel by American author Steven Saylor, first published by St. Martin's Press in 1996. It is the fifth book in his Roma Sub Rosa series of mystery novels set in the final decades of the Roman Republic. The main character is the Roman sleuth Gordianus the Finder.

Plot summary
The year is 52 BC, and Rome is in turmoil as rival gangs fight it out in the streets. When the gang leader and radical politician Publius Clodius Pulcher is found murdered on the Appian Way south of Rome, the main suspect is Clodius' rival gang leader, Titus Annius Milo. Gordianus is hired by Cicero, who is Milo's defender, to find the true murderer. In the shadows lurk powerful men such as Caesar and Pompey.

Roma Sub Rosa
1996 American novels
52 BC
St. Martin's Press books